GTS Jewel of the Seas is a  operated by Royal Caribbean. The ship was completed in the spring of 2004 with her maiden voyage in May of that year.

History
Jewel of the Seas initially operated cruises from Rome (Civitavecchia), Italy, to the Greek Isles in the Mediterranean Sea until November 2016, the ship re-positioned to cruising from San Juan, Puerto Rico to Caribbean destinations. In March 2019 the ship re-positioned from the Caribbean to the Mediterranean where it operated cruises in the Greek Isles and as of December 2019 it has been home ported in Dubai and operated cruises within the Persian Gulf.

In April 2016, Jewel of the Seas completed a £20 million renovation.

Coronavirus pandemic

On 11 March 2020, the ship was docked at the Dubai Cruise Terminal with two passengers that were experiencing respiratory illnesses.  After the ship was placed in quarantine, test results for the two sick passengers returned negative, and the ship was given the all clear.  However, because many ports had begun to close, Jewel of the Seas ended up staying at Dubai for the duration of the cruise, and Royal Caribbean gave the passengers full refunds and allowed them to use the ship as a hotel.

On 29 April 2020, a 27-year-old male Polish electrician of Jewel of the Seas jumped overboard from deck 12 while the ship was anchored near Corfu, Greece. His absence was only realized over two days later. The Hellenic Coast Guard conducted a large search operation but was unsuccessful.

Up until late April 2021 Jewel of the Seas was at anchor in Poole Bay off the Dorset coast in the UK sitting out the Covid-19 pandemic. As with the other cruise ships in the area the ship made occasional visits to The Port of Southampton to collect supplies and fuel. As of 3 May 2021 she was heading for Cádiz in Spain. Jewel of the Seas was most recently spotted docking in the Firth of Forth in Scotland near Rosyth Dockyard and next to the Forth Bridge.

Notes

References

External links

 Official website

Ships of Royal Caribbean International
Ships built in Papenburg
Panamax cruise ships
2004 ships